"May Each Day" is a song written by George Wyle and Mort Green and performed by Andy Williams.  The song reached #19 in the UK in 1966.  The song originally appeared on his 1963 album Days of Wine and Roses and Other TV Requests.

The song was often used to close his shows, such as The Andy Williams Show, where he sang "...May each day of your life be a good day, and good night." The song was also played during his memorial service

References

Songs with music by George Wyle
1966 singles
Andy Williams songs
CBS Records singles
1963 songs